Pattegar (also spelt as Patvegar, Patewegar, Patwegar, Patvekari & Pattagar) is a Hindu community predominantly residing in the Indian states of Karnataka, Maharashtra, Andhra Pradesh and Telangana. They wear the sacred thread and are Kshatriyas. They are Somavamshiya Sahasrarjun Kshatriyas or SSK Samaj. and are given reservation in Maharashtra.

All of them follow Hinduism and are traditionally silk weavers. Their principal deity is Shakti. They have their lineage to legendary king Sahasrarjuna and celebrate Sahasrarjuna Jayanti. They have GRAM SABHA (local samaj forum) in their localities which are registered as societies or trusts.

Language

The Pattegars speak a language called Pattegari or Khatri or Saurashtra, a dialect of Gujarati with the amalgamation of present-day Sanskrit, Hindi, Marathi, Gujarati, Punjabi, Telugu and Kannada.

See also
Patnūlkarar
Pattusali

References

Kshatriya communities
Social groups of India
Social groups of Karnataka
Karnataka society
Social groups of Maharashtra
Social groups of Andhra Pradesh
Social groups of Telangana